George Clarke's Amazing Spaces is a British television series that first aired on Channel 4 on 23 October 2012. In 2015 it was nominated for BAFTA Best Feature.

Background

The show follows people who turn unconventional things, such as old boats, into places to live, with a particular emphasis on creative use of small spaces. It is presented by George Clarke. The spin-off is titled Shed of the Year.

Series
Series 1 (2012)
Series 2 (2013)
Series 3 (2014)
Series 4 (2014)
Series 5 (2015)
Series 6 (2016)
Series 7 (2018)
Series 8 (2017-2019)
Series 9 (2020)
Series 10 (2022)
Series 11 (2023)

Shed of the Year
Shed of the Year (2014)
Shed of the Year (2015)
Shed of the Year (2016)
Shed of the Year (2017)

See also
Tiny House Nation

References

External links
 Channel 4 website
 
 2014 Amazing Spaces Shed of the year revealed 
Shed of the year 2016 shortlist – all the sheds announced

2012 British television series debuts
2010s British documentary television series
2020s British documentary television series
Channel 4 original programming
Home renovation television series